Temyan is a rural locality (a village) in Zaoksky District of Tula Oblast, Russia.

References

Rural localities in Tula Oblast
Aleksinsky Uyezd